Pierre Hentges (3 September 1890 – 26 December 1975) was a Luxembourgish gymnast who competed in the 1912 Summer Olympics. In 1912 he was a member of the Luxembourgian team which finished fourth in the team, European system competition and fifth in the team, free system event. In the individual all-around he finished 18th.

References

External links
 list of Luxembourgian gymnasts
 Pierre Hentges' profile at Sports Reference.com
 Pierre Hentges's profile at Luxemburger Autorenlexikon 

1890 births
1975 deaths
Luxembourgian male artistic gymnasts
Olympic gymnasts of Luxembourg
Gymnasts at the 1912 Summer Olympics